Lophoprora is a genus of moths belonging to the family Tortricidae.

Species
Lophoprora cyanostacta Meyrick, 1930

References

 , 2005: World Catalogue of Insects volume 5 Tortricidae.
 , 1930, Exotic Microlepidoptera 3: 611.

External links
tortricidae.com

Polyorthini
Taxa named by Edward Meyrick
Tortricidae genera